Michał Rafał Łabenda (born 10 September 1974, in Wrocław) is a Polish diplomat, serving as Polish ambassador to Egypt since 2018, Mongolia (2015–2018), Azerbaijan (2010–2014).

Life 
He holds an M.A. in Arab studies (Al-Farabi Kazakh National University, 1999). In 2006, Łabenda defended at the University of Warsaw, Institute of Oriental Studies his Ph.D. thesis on Muslim movements in the Fergana Valley. His doctoral supervisor was Anna Parzymies.

Łabenda worked at the KARTA Center between 1998 and 1999. In 1999, he started his career at the Ministry of Foreign Affairs. From 2000 to 2001 he was an intern in Osaka. He has been Second Secretary at the Polish Embassy in Tashkent, Uzbekistan (2002–2005), deputy director of Eastern Department (2007–2010), ambassador of Poland to Azerbaijan (2010–2014), visiting ambassador of Poland to Mongolia (2015–2018) and, since October 2018, ambassador of Poland to Egypt, with accreditation  to Sudan and Eritrea. He has been also lecturing at the University of Warsaw.

Łabenda is married and has a son Jan. He speaks English, German, Russian, Kazakh, Arabic, Uzbek, Azerbaijani and French.

Works 

 Język kazachski ["Kazakh language”], Dialog, Warszawa 2000, 
 Islam a terroryzm ["Islam and terrorism"], (ed. Anna Parzymies), Dialog, Warszawa 2003, 
 Muzułmanie w Europie ["Muslims in Europe"], (ed. Anna Parzymies), Dialog, Warszawa 2005, 
 Życie codzienne w Samarkandzie ["Everyday life in Samarkand"], (with Abdurasul Niyazov), Dialog, Warszawa 2007, 
 Dolina Fergańska w czasach islamu ["Fergana Valley during Islam times”], Dialog, Warszawa 2016,

References 

1974 births
Al-Farabi Kazakh National University alumni
Ambassadors of Poland to Azerbaijan
Ambassadors of Poland to Egypt
Ambassadors of Poland to Mongolia
Living people
Diplomats from Wrocław
Polish orientalists
Academic staff of the University of Warsaw